The Hope Basin is a geological feature of the Chukchi Sea Shelf. It lies off the Chukchi Sea coast of Alaska. Its area extends from the outer continental shelf of the Seward Peninsula for about  westwards off the coast of Chukotka towards Wrangel Island.

The Hope Basin is limited on its northeastern side by the Herald Arch (Herald Thrust), a basement uplift cored by Cretaceous thrust faults. The Herald Arch is named after Herald Island.

Type: Early Tertiary extensional basin (mainly).

References

 
 

Marine geology
Landforms of the Chukchi Sea